Venomous Rat Regeneration Vendor is the fifth solo studio album by American musician Rob Zombie. The album was released on April 23, 2013, four days after the release of Zombie's film The Lords of Salem. The tracklisting was confirmed on Zombie's Facebook page on February 22. This is the first Rob Zombie album to feature drummer Ginger Fish who, like John 5, was previously a member of the band Marilyn Manson. A music video for the album's first single "Dead City Radio and the New Gods of Supertown" was released April 8, 2013.

For Record Store Day 2013, Zombie released a promotional single for "Dead City Radio and the New Gods of Supertown" (with b-side "Teenage Nosferatu Pussy") on 10 inches colored vinyl printed on a reverse groove, with artwork by Alex Horley. This featured a slightly alternate edit of "Dead City Radio" clocking in at 3:54 instead of 3:28 which included an extended pre-chorus and outro not heard on the full album release. Best Buy stores offered a limited edition featuring a 3D sticker cover with a code for exclusive behind-the-scenes footage on the making of the album.

Sales and reception
The album received generally mixed reviews from critics; it was credited by some, while criticized by others.

A rather negative review came from AllMusic's Stephen Thomas Erlewine, stating "there seems to be a concept album tying [it] together but it'd require patience to piece together, patience that only fanboys could afford". He also questioned Zombie's decision to cover the Grand Funk Railroad's song "We're an American Band": "Why he decided to cover Grand Funk Railroad is anybody's guess – maybe somebody at the label thought it'd help get him on the radio, but at this point, nobody should be under any illusion that Rob Zombie could expand his audience". A more positive review came from Chuck Armstrong of Loudwire who called it "Arguably his best album since his debut masterpiece", before closing his review with it "will be an album that you listen to from beginning to end, and then you'll want to do it all over again".

Venomous Rat Regeneration Vendor sold 34,000 copies in the United States in its first week of release to land at No. 7 on the Billboard 200 albums chart.

Track listing

Personnel 
 Rob Zombie – vocals
 John 5 – guitar, backing vocals
 Piggy D. – bass guitar, backing vocals
 Ginger Fish – drums, percussion
 Bob Marlette – keyboards, production, programming, engineering
 Josh Freese – additional drums
 Kevin Churko – mixing, mastering
 Kane Churko – mastering, assisted mixing
 Zeuss – programming
 Chris Marlette – programming
 Ava Lucia Skurkis – voice actress (Rob Zombie's niece)

Charts

References

External links
Rob Zombie's official website

Rob Zombie albums
2013 albums
Roadrunner Records albums
Albums produced by Rob Zombie